Major-General Archibald Campbell CB (21 October 1774 – 1838) was a British Army officer who served as Lieutenant Governor of Jersey.

Military career
Born the son of Sir James Campbell of Inverneill and a member of the Campbells of Inverneill, Campbell was made a Lieutenant-Colonel in the 6th Regiment of Foot in 1812 and commanded the 1st Bn 6th Foot at the Battle of Vitoria in June 1813. Campbell was appointed Lieutenant Governor of Jersey in 1835 and died in office in 1838. He is buried in the Parish Church of St Helier.

Family
He married Martha Elizabeth Higginson.

References

1774 births
1838 deaths
British Army major generals
Companions of the Order of the Bath
Governors of Jersey
Royal Warwickshire Fusiliers officers
British Army personnel of the Peninsular War